The New Zealand cricket team in Australia in 2001–02 played 5 first-class matches including 3 Tests.  New Zealand also played in an LOI tri-series against Australia and South Africa.

Test series summary

1st Test

2nd Test

3rd Test

See also
2001–02 VB Series

External links
 CricketArchive itinerary

References
 Playfair Cricket Annual (annual)
 Wisden Cricketers Almanack (annual)

2001 in Australian cricket
2002 in Australian cricket
2001 in New Zealand cricket
2002 in New Zealand cricket
2001–02 Australian cricket season
2001-02
International cricket competitions in 2001–02